Helscott is a hamlet southwest of Marhamchurch in north Cornwall, England. It is on the A39 road and nearby to the east is East Helscott. According to the Post Office the 2011 census population was included in the civil parish of Poundstock.

References

Hamlets in Cornwall